From March 12 to June 27, 1940, voters of the Democratic Party elected delegates to the 1940 Democratic National Convention through a series of primaries, caucuses, and conventions. Incumbent President Franklin D. Roosevelt was selected as the party's presidential nominee despite not formally declaring a campaign for a third term. Supporters effectively drafted Roosevelt, who was non-committal about seeking re-election, amid rising concerns over war in Europe.

Candidates

Franklin D. Roosevelt
Incumbent President Roosevelt remained sufficiently popular to seek nomination for a third term, if he desired, though he had alienated many conservative and Southern members of his party, whom he had relied on for his 1932 nomination, by attempting to purge critics of the New Deal in the 1938 elections.

As foreign policy tensions mounted in Europe following the German annexation of Czechoslovakia and partition of Poland, Roosevelt was urged to run for an unprecedented third consecutive term. Roosevelt encouraged speculation but remained quiet. Privately, he prepared for his post-presidency, putting the finishing touches on a presidential library and signing a contract to become a contributing editor with Collier's upon his departure from office. In response to private lobbying from Senator George W. Norris, Roosevelt openly spoke of his hopes for retirement. In February, he suffered a minor heart attack. Meanwhile, the war in Europe had largely dragged to a halt, entering a phase now known as the "Phoney War." Amid rising hope for peace, Roosevelt returned to focusing on retirement.

The heir apparent to Roosevelt, should he decline to run, was Secretary of State Cordell Hull. Roosevelt encouraged his ambitions, intimating to Hull's wife at a cabinet dinner that the Secretary "had better get used to [making speeches]," because "[h]e'll have a lot of it to do soon." However, Hull found it impermissible to campaign while actively serving as Secretary and, knowing that his nomination would depend on Roosevelt's support, remained silent pending Roosevelt's decision.

Any chance of peace in Europe was ended on April 9, 1940, when Germany invaded Denmark and Norway. Around one month later, the Battle of France began and French forces quickly fell into retreat. Though Roosevelt never formally declared a candidacy, supporters entered his name in presidential preference contests and stood as delegates with the promise to nominate Roosevelt at the national party convention. In the Illinois primary, which required a candidate to make a sworn declaration of intent to seek the presidency, Roosevelt's name was placed on the ballot without any such declaration. Officials reasoned that he had been at sea when the deadline to declare passed. 

Any doubts Roosevelt had about a third term were erased upon the Italian declaration of war on France. This, combined with isolationism among both parties in Congress, solidified his decision to accept re-nomination to a third term. When the Democratic delegates convened in July, none doubted that Roosevelt would accept their nomination.

John Nance Garner
Vice President John Nance Garner, who had been one of Roosevelt's primary opponents in 1932, announced his candidacy on December 18, 1939. His candidacy centered on opposition to the New Deal, Roosevelt personally, and the idea of a third term, but his conservatism put him on an uphill course with the rank-and-file of the party.

James Farley
Postmaster General and party chairman James Farley was the second challenger to Roosevelt but far more aligned with the New Deal platform than Garner. Farley had support from professional politicians but suffered from a lack of familiarity with policy issues and lingering anti-Catholicism. Cardinal George Mundelein lobbied Farley not to run, but he forcefully declined: "I will not let myself be kicked around by Roosevelt or anyone else."

Favorite sons
The following candidates were "favorite sons," who stood for nomination only in their respective home states for the purpose of controlling that state's delegation at the 1940 Democratic National Convention.

Former Lieutenant Governor Charles W. Sawyer of Ohio
Senator Joseph C. O'Mahoney of Wyoming
Senator Millard Tydings of Maryland
Senator Burton K. Wheeler of Montana

Declined
The following candidates were the subject of media speculation regarding a potential candidacy or were ambitious of the presidency, but ultimately declined to run:

William O. Douglas, Associate Justice of the Supreme Court and former chair of the Securities Exchange Commission
Harry Hopkins, U.S. Secretary of Commerce and trusted advisor to Roosevelt
Cordell Hull, U.S. Secretary of State
Robert H. Jackson, Attorney General of the United States
Paul V. McNutt, Administrator of the Federal Security Agency and former Governor of Indiana
Henry A. Wallace, U.S. Secretary of Agriculture

Primary Results

See also
Republican Party presidential primaries, 1940
White primary

Notes

References

Further reading